Holley Central School District is a public school district that serves the village of Holley, New York and the towns of Murray and Clarendon. The school district consists of 1,385 students in grades PreK-12 (one PreK-6 elementary school and one 7-12 junior-senior high school). The district superintendent is Brian Bartalo. In 2011 the Holley Central School district began constructing a capital project that included the following upgrades:
 Renovated remainder of school to create classrooms that meet current code, safety and performance standards
 Renovated remainder of school mechanical systems to meet current code, safety and performance standards 
 Renovation and addition to accommodate kitchen and cafeteria: provide updated, efficient and multi-function adaptable spaces 
 Renovation and addition to accommodate gym storage, fitness and multi-purpose/wrestling needs 
 Roof replacement (entire building) 
 Site improvements – separation and coordination of traffic patterns and accessibility to improve safety and flow regarding buses, student drop-off/parent waiting/visitor parking/staff parking 
 Fire alarm system upgrades 
 New telephone system (Voice over Internet Protocol) 
 Technology upgrades (wireless, projection screens) 
 Security upgrades: access control (card readers), intrusion detection (alarms), surveillance (cameras)
 Revised layout will allow for access and use of contiguous fields and support structures without crossing vehicle roadways 
 Adequate, safe access and parking for parents and visitors 
 Correctly sized fields and facilities for PE and athletics needs 
 All-weather track surface, available for public as well as student use

Board of education
The current board of education members are:
Brenda Swanger, President
Robin Silvis, Vice President
Andrea Newman
John Heise
Melissa Ierlan
Mark Porter
Anne Smith

Schools
 Holley Elementary School, Principal - Karri Schiavone
 Holley Junior-Senior High School, Principal - Susan Cory

References

External links
 

School districts in New York (state)
Education in Orleans County, New York